The following are the national records in athletics in Lebanon maintained by its athletics federation: Fédération Libanaise d'Athlétisme (FLA).

Outdoor

Key to tables:

+ = en route to a longer distance

h = hand timing

NWI = no wind information

Men

Women

Indoor

Men

Women

References
General
Lebanese Records – Men Outdoor 20 August 2020 updated
Specific

External links
FLA web site

Lebanon
Athletics in Lebanon
Athletics
Athletics